This is the discography of Kazakh singer Dimash Kudaibergen.

Albums

Singles

Songs written

References

Kazakhstani music
Discographies of Kazakhstani artists